Dmitry Kalinovsky or Dzmitry Kalinowski (born February 24, 1972) is a former freestyle swimmer from Minsk, Belarus, who represented his native country at two consecutive Summer Olympics, starting in 1996 (Atlanta, Georgia). He is best known for winning the bronze medal in the men's 50 m freestyle at the 1996 European SC Championships in Rostock. Kalinovsky holding national record.

References
 
 

1972 births
Living people
Belarusian male freestyle swimmers
Olympic swimmers of Belarus
Swimmers at the 1996 Summer Olympics
Swimmers at the 2000 Summer Olympics